The March 741 is a Formula One car, designed, developed and built by March Engineering for the 1974 and 1975 Formula One seasons. Like most of the other cars on the field, it is powered by a  Ford-Cosworth DFV engine. It was driven by Hans-Joachim Stuck, Reine Wisell, Howden Ganley, Vittorio Brambilla, and Lella Lombardi.

References

March Formula One cars